This is a list of MPs elected to the House of Commons at the 7th 1820 United Kingdom general election, arranged by constituency. The Parliament was summoned 21 April 1820 and dissolved 2 June 1826. The Prime Minister throughout was the leader of the Tory Party, the Earl of Liverpool.



Changes

Results overturned on petition

By-elections

See also

1820 United Kingdom general election
List of United Kingdom by-elections (1818–1832)
List of parliaments of the United Kingdom

1820 elections in the United Kingdom
General election
1820
 List
UK MPs